CFVD-FM, also known as Horizon 95,5 and Plaisir 95,5, is a French language hot adult contemporary radio station that operates at 95.5 FM in Dégelis, Quebec, Canada. 

Created by Radio Dégelis Inc., the station was licensed in 1978 at 1370 kHz AM with a transmitter of 1000 W, and was licensed to convert to FM in 1994.

CFVD-FM applied twice to the CRTC, in 2006 and 2010, to add an FM transmitter at Rivière-du-Loup, Quebec which would operate at 102.5 MHz; they were denied both times.

To highlight its 30th anniversary, the station took on the name Horizon FM   in 2008.

In 2012 the station was acquired by a group called Attraction Radio, who later morphed into Arsenal Media. Since 2021 Arsenal Media has incorporated the station in its Plaisir branding, which designates pop and nostalgia-oriented content.

Transmitters

Those transmitters were installed in 1983 and 1985 respectively. In 1983 the station established a repeater in Cabano, CFVD-FM-1; at 102.7 MHz and 50 W; this repeater closed down after the core station migrated from AM to FM.

References

External links
Official site
 

Fvd
Fvd
Fvd
Radio stations established in 1978
1978 establishments in Quebec